Deli Hüsrev Paşa (c. 1495 - 1544) was an Ottoman and Bosnian statesman from the Sanjak of Bosnia. His epithet "deli" means "crazy" in Ottoman Turkish, which was ascribed to him because of his quick temper.

Biography

He was born in 1495 as one of the early members of the Sokolović family (which would go on to spawn some of the greatest statesmen of the Empire). His exact birthplace is unknown. Some historians place it near the Glasinac Plateau near Sarajevo, while others put it more eastward, to the Podrinje region of Bosnia. His younger brother was Lala Kara Mustafa Pasha.

He was appointed sanjak-bey of Konya in 1516. He participated in the Ottoman–Mamluk War (1516–17) and personally fought in the siege of the city of Harput. He also attended the expedition to Egypt shortly after.

In 1520, he took part in the suppression of the Qizilbash uprising. In 1521, he was appointed beylerbey of the Diyarbekir Eyalet, following the death of its former governor, Sakalli Mehmed Pasha, only to suppress a local rebellion in his eyalet in 1526.  During his governorship of the province, he was accused of bribery and even money falsification by an unknown statesman, but the charges were never investigated.

In 1531, a Safavid Empire statesman named Ulama Pasha defected to the Ottomans, however, Husrev was suspicious of his true intentions and had a conflict with him. As a result, he was deposed from his position.

In 1532, he personally came to Istanbul and visited Sultan Suleyman bearing gifts with him. The Sultan brought Husrev with him during the military campaign on Austria the same year. Immediately after his return, he was named beylerbey of Aleppo.

In 1534, he became beylerbey of Damascus, and, in 1535 governor of Egypt. During his service in Egypt, the province saw such an economic blossoming that it even became suspicious to some. It is speculated that Husrev Pasha increased local taxes without notifying his superiors, although this too was never proved.

He was named third vizier in 1536/37 and later second vizier in 1538. When the grand vizier Lütfi Pasha was deposed in 1541, Husrev, as second vizier expected the post for himself. He was surprised when the third vizier, Hadım Suleiman Pasha was chosen instead. When the latter died in 1544, Husrev was again expecting to get his post. However, during a divan meeting, he apparently drew a dagger and threatened then-third vizier Rüstem Pasha. After the Sultan heard of this, he appointed Rüstem Pasha as Grand Vizier instead. Husrev was apparently so disappointed and depressed with being skipped for the post a second time, that he didn't eat or drink for days (some sources even say weeks). As a result, he soon got ill and died.

He was apparently married to the Sultan's sister, Hatice Sultan, being her third husband, but was widowed by her death in 1538.

Legacy

Mimar Sinan erected a tomb for Husrev Pasha in 1545. During his career, Husrev Pasha built several mosques, schools, fountains and other important buildings in the areas he governed, mostly Egypt, Aleppo and Damascus.

References

16th-century people from the Ottoman Empire
Ottoman governors of Bosnia
Ottoman generals
Bosnia and Herzegovina generals
Bosnian Muslims from the Ottoman Empire
1544 deaths